Davis Lake is a lake in the Interior of British Columbia.  It lies at the head of Davis Creek, just north of the town of Kettle Valley, British Columbia.

Nearby is Mount Davis.

References

Lakes of British Columbia
Boundary Country
Similkameen Division Yale Land District